East London Arts & Music (also known as ELAM) is a free school sixth form located in Bromley-by-Bow in East London, England.

History
Established in 2014, ELAM is for students aged 16 to 19 who wish to pursue a career in music, games design or film and TV.

In April 2017 ELAM moved into its permanent home in Bromley-by-Bow, East London. Prior to this ELAM was based at School 21 in Stratford.

In May 2017 ELAM was graded Outstanding in every category by Ofsted in its first full inspection.

Academics
ELAM does not have set grade boundaries for prospective students, however each applicant is assessed on a case-by-case basis. The course structure of ELAM requires all students to study an Extended Diploma in Music, Games Design or Film and Television in addition to English and Mathematics courses (ranging from GCSE to A-level grade depending on the student's previous achievement).

Notable former students
Girli, singer & rapper
Stella Quaresma, member of FLO
Ama Lou, singer & model
Ashlee Singh, singer
Molly Rainford, singer & actor

References

External links
East London Arts & Music official website

Free schools in London
Education in the London Borough of Tower Hamlets
Educational institutions established in 2014
2014 establishments in England
Bromley-by-Bow